Matti Salo (born 1980), professionally known as Asa and previously as Avain, is a Finnish rapper. He is also a member of hip hop and reggae group Jätkäjätkät.

Career beginnings

In the early 2000s, Salo was signed to Warner Music Finland. Under his initial stage name Avain, he released his debut album Punainen tiili (The Red Brick) in 2001. With its socially conscious lyrics, the album is considered to be one of the most important Finnish hip hop albums of all time. Soon after its release, Salo parted ways with his record company and went on a few years hiatus.

Later career

While the rights to his former stage name remained at Warner Music, Salo emerged in 2004 with his current alias Asa. To date, he has released nine studio albums, two of which have reached number two on the Finnish Albums Chart, along with three albums with the group Jätkäjätkät.

Personal life
In 2006, Asa was fined for possession of marijuana, cocaine and hash.

Selected discography

Solo albums

With Jätkäjätkät

References

Living people
1980 births
Finnish rappers
Finnish hip hop musicians